Myers Park is a neighborhood and historic district in Charlotte, North Carolina, United States.

Neighborhoods that are near Myers Park include Dilworth and Sedgefield to the west, Eastover to the east, Uptown Charlotte to the north, and South Park and Foxcroft to the south. The Little Sugar Creek Greenway runs along the western edge of the neighborhood, adjacent to Freedom Park. Though its boundaries originally coincided with the boundaries of the  John Spring Myers farm, the neighborhood, by 2008, comprised  and had a population of 9,809. Myers Park is bounded by Queens Road to the north, Providence Road to the east, Sharon Road to the south, and Park Road to the west.

Demographics
Of the 9,809 people living in Myers Park in 2008, 2,249 were under 18 years of age; approx. 1,511 were over 64 years of age.  There were 4,643 housing units in Myers Park.  The median household income was $109,772. The average house value in Myers Park was $778,762.

Culture
Myers Park is home to the "Booty Loop" a popular 2.85-mile walking, running, and cycling route. The route follows Queens Road to Selwyn Avenue, turns right down Queens Road West to Hopedale Avenue and then right back onto Queens Road, completing the loop. The cycling loop is also the original home to the 24 Hours of Booty annual charitable event, hosted by the 24 Foundation. The 24 hour fundraising event draws hundreds of cyclists and thousands of spectators each year.

The neighborhood's central location and wide, tree lined streets make it a popular choice to include in event routes for local charity runs and the Charlotte Marathon.

Transportation

Mass transit
The following buses from the Charlotte Area Transit System (CATS) serve Myers Park and the surrounding neighborhoods:
 #6  (Kings Drive)
 #14 (Providence Road)
 #15 (Randolph Road)
 #18 (Selwyn Avenue)
 #19 (Park Road)
 #20 (Queens/Sharon Road)

Roads
Providence Road, Kings Drive, and Queens Road are major thoroughfares in Myers Park.  The highly confusing intersection of "Queens and Queens and Providence and Providence" in front of the Myers Park Library is well-known, as when traveling toward Uptown Charlotte on Providence Road, one must actually turn right at the intersection to stay on Providence, not go straight.

Education and libraries

School system
Residents of Myers Park attend Charlotte-Mecklenburg Schools, including Myers Park High School, Alexander Graham Middle School, Myers Park Traditional Elementary School, and Selwyn Elementary School.

Myers Park is served by the Myers Park Branch of the Public Library of Charlotte and Mecklenburg County.  The library is located at the corner of Queens Road and Providence Road.

Sites of interest
Christ Episcopal Church
Little Church on the Lane – originally Myers Park Moravian Church
Manor Theatre – one of Charlotte's oldest movie theatres, permanently closed in 2020
Myers Park Baptist Church
Myers Park Presbyterian Church
Myers Park United Methodist Church
Edgehill Park
Duke Mansion – 400 Hermitage Road
Queens University of Charlotte
Theatre Charlotte – Charlotte's oldest arts organization and the state's longest running community theatre
Wing Haven Gardens and Bird Sanctuary

Historic district
The Myers Park Historic District is a national historic district encompasses 670 contributing buildings, 4 contributing sites, and contributing structures in Myers Park. It was developed after 1911 and includes notable examples of Bungalow / American Craftsman, Colonial Revival, and Tudor Revival style architecture. It was added to the National Register of Historic Places in 1995.

Notable Historic Structures
Elizabeth Lawrence House and Garden (1949)
H.M. McAden House (1917) designed by architect Louis H. Asbury
J. Luther Snyder House (1920)
John Jamison House (1912)
Lambeth-Gossett House (1916)
James Buchanan Duke House (1914)
Queens College campus, five buildings dated to 1916
Myers Park Moravian Church (1924)
Myers Park Presbyterian Church (1928)
Myers Park United Methodist Church (1929)

References

External links

 
 Neighborhood Guide
 Myers Park video

Streetcar suburbs
Neighborhoods in Charlotte, North Carolina
Populated places established in 1911
Historic districts on the National Register of Historic Places in North Carolina
Colonial Revival architecture in North Carolina
Tudor Revival architecture in North Carolina
National Register of Historic Places in Mecklenburg County, North Carolina
Houses in Charlotte, North Carolina